() is a Chiang Mai chronicle that covers mostly about religious history, and contains a section on early Lan Na kings to 1516/1517.  Similar period Pali chronicles include the Chamadevivamsa and the Mulasasana. Originally written in Pali by a Buddhist monk, it is said to have been completed in 1527 but the oldest extant manuscript dates only to 1788. The chronicle was one of the Chiang Mai-based chronicles maintained during the Burmese rule of Lan Na (1558–1775) and it was referenced by later Burmese chronicles, most notably Maha Yazawin, the standard chronicle of Toungoo Dynasty.

The oldest extant manuscript of 1788 is written in a late Khmer script, and has gone through at least a dozen revisions. It was translated to Khmer and translated "from Khmer to Thai to Pali to French and back again to Pali." The chronicle was revised at least four times during the Chakri Dynasty. The Thai-language version by King Mongkut's reign was no longer a verbatim copy of the 1788 copy, having incorporated early Thai nationalist narratives. It was finally translated into English in 1968 by N.A. Jayawickrama. Thus, the English version today is a "compendium of knowledge of several different ages and places, rather than of a singular time and place."

The chronicle continues to be of interest to Burma scholars. In its "secular section" about early kings, the chronicle extols most about the conquests of King Anawrahta of Pagan Dynasty. The author credits Anawrahta's role as a great Buddhist king into bringing Theravada Buddhism to present-day northern Thailand. It is the first historical text of Southeast Asia to mention Anawrahta's conquest of a kingdom held by one Manohara, which British colonial period historians translated to King Manuha of Thaton Kingdom. However, Michael Aung-Thwin points out the author merely mentions "here itself in the Rammanna Country", which was more likely Haripunjaya, the Mon kingdom that existed before Lan Na.

References

Bibliography
 

Buddhist literature
Buddhism in Thailand
Lan Na chronicles
Burmese chronicles
16th century in Thailand
History of Buddhism in Myanmar